Robert Byrne (February 4, 1886 – December 31, 1967) was a North Dakota Republican Party politician who served as the Secretary of State of North Dakota from 1925 to 1934. Byrne served in the North Dakota House of Representatives from 1917 to 1920, and in the North Dakota Senate from 1921 to 1924. He first won election to the Secretary of State position in 1924, and served until he was defeated by James D. Gronna in the 1934 Republican Primary.

In 1930, when the Capitol building was on fire, Byrne was able to save an original copy of the state Constitution from fire, suffering cuts and burns in the process.

He died in Bismarck, North Dakota at the age of 81 in 1967.

Notes

1886 births
1967 deaths
Secretaries of State of North Dakota
Republican Party members of the North Dakota House of Representatives
Republican Party North Dakota state senators
20th-century American politicians